Benvenue is an unincorporated community in Dauphin County, in the U.S. state of Pennsylvania. It is situated on Duncan's Island in Reed Township.

History
A post office called Benvenue was established in 1831, and remained in operation until it was discontinued in 1907. Benvenue is likely derived from Scottish meaning a "mountain and good entertainment therewith".

References

Unincorporated communities in Dauphin County, Pennsylvania
Unincorporated communities in Pennsylvania